Lezak is a surname. Notable people with the surname include:

 Jason Lezak (born 1975), American swimmer and swimming executive
 Muriel Lezak (1927–2021), American neuropsychologist
 Sidney I. Lezak (1924–2006), American lawyer

See also
 Ležáky